Oropa  is a frazione  of the municipality of Biella, in Piedmont, northern Italy. It is famous for the Black Virgin of Oropa. Her statue is located in the Sanctuary of Oropa, the basilica of the Sacro Monte di Oropa, one of the Sacri Monti. It is an important destination for local tourism and pilgrimage. 

In 1874 was established a meteorogical station by Francesco Denza.

In 1998 was opened the botanical garden.

Monumental cemetery 

In the monumental cemetery are buried Riccardo Gualino, Quintino Sella and Vittorio Sella.

Sports 
It's a ski resort.

Cycling 
Oropa has been the finish line of a stage of the Giro d'Italia six times.

See also 

 Cane di Oropa
 Pezzata Rossa d'Oropa

References

External links